The men's 100 metres event at the 1971 Pan American Games was held in Cali on 31 July and 1 August.

Medalists

Results

Heats
Held on 31 July

Wind:Heat 1: +2.2 m/s, Heat 2: +1.9 m/s, Heat 3: +2.3 m/s, Heat 4: +2.5 m/s

Semifinals
Held on 31 July

Wind:Heat 1: +4.2 m/s, Heat 2: +0.9 m/s

Final
Held on 1 August

Wind: 0.0 m/s

References

Athletics at the 1971 Pan American Games
1971